Jeffrey B. Miller is a law enforcement official who served as the 18th commissioner of the Pennsylvania State Police. Miller is vice president for security for the Kansas City Chiefs.

Miller, a native of Harrisburg, Pennsylvania, served in that position from March 24, 2003, after being confirmed by the Pennsylvania State Senate, until August 8, 2008. Miller left the Pennsylvania State Police to work for the National Football League, where he served in the security department ending his tenure in 2016 as the senior vice president for security. Miller is a member of the Homeland Security Advisory Council.

Education
Miller is a 1981 graduate of Central Dauphin High School in Harrisburg, Pennsylvania. He was awarded an A.A. by the University of South Florida. Miller later earned his BS, criminal justice, from Elizabethtown College and a Master of Public Administration for the Pennsylvania State University.

Professional career

Pennsylvania State Police
Miller enlisted with the state police in 1984 and became a member of fifty-sixth graduating class of the Pennsylvania State Police Academy in Hershey, Pennsylvania.  He then moved through the ranks, attaining: Corporal in 1988, Sergeant in 1990, Lieutenant in 1993, Captain in 1995, and Major in January 2002.

On January 9, 2003, Governor Edward G. Rendell nominated Miller to become 18th Commissioner of the Pennsylvania State Police, a Cabinet-level post. Col. Miller was unanimously confirmed by the Senate of Pennsylvania March 24, 2003.

Miller is known for his handling of the West Nickel Mines School shooting in Nickel Mines, Pennsylvania.

Miller retired from the PSP on August 8, 2008. Command was temporarily transferred to Lt. Colonel Frank Pawlowski.

National Football League
Following his career with the Pennsylvania State Police, Miller accepted a position with the National Football League (NFL). He served as the league's director of strategic security, a newly created position, from 2008 to 2012. Miller focused on policing fan behavior, stadium security, even cheating by teams. In 2012 he was promoted to senior vice president for security, a position he held until his resignation in 2016.

In September 2018, Miller became the vice president of security for the Kansas City Chiefs.

Personal
Miller resides in the Kansas City metropolitan area with his wife Andrea, and their two daughters.

References

Living people
American state police officers
Politicians from Harrisburg, Pennsylvania
Elizabethtown College alumni
Pennsylvania State Police
State cabinet secretaries of Pennsylvania
National Football League executives
Year of birth missing (living people)